Umemoto (written: 梅本) is a Japanese surname. Notable people with the surname include:

Elyse Umemoto (born 1984), American beauty pageant winner, dance team manager and television personality
, Japanese video game composer
, Japanese psychologist

Japanese-language surnames